Anna Berta, formerly known as Anna Brazhnikova (born 4 October 1991), is a Swedish former tennis player.

She achieved the No. 1 rankings position for Girls Under-18 in Sweden according to the January 2009 tennis rankings list published by the Swedish Tennis Federation.

In 2009, Anna reached four ITF women's singles quarterfinals (twice as a qualifier), at $10k events in Turkey and Egypt. She played her last match on the ITF Pro Circuit in July 2011 in Tampere, Finland.

ITF Circuit finals

Singles: 2 (0–2)

Doubles: 8 (3–5)

References

External links
 
 
 Profile for Anna Brazhnikova at the Swedish Olympic Committee's list of Active Athletes
 Profile for Anna Brazhnikova at the Swedish Tennis Federation's rankings

1991 births
Swedish female tennis players
Living people
Sportspeople from Tashkent
20th-century Swedish women
21st-century Swedish women